Eucosma cocana, the shortleaf pinecone borer moth, is a species of moth of the family Tortricidae. It is found in south-eastern North America and along the eastern seaboard.

The wingspan is 18–22 mm. Adults are tan to reddish brown with grey shading.

The larvae feed on Pinus species, including Pinus echinata, Pinus virginiana and Pinus rigida. Young larvae bore into the cones of their host plant. They move to another cone when it is eaten out. Full-grown larvae drop to the ground to pupate in the soil, where they overwinter.

References

Moths described in 1907
Eucosmini